Skeletonema marinoi is a diatom. Together with S. dohrnii, this species has flattened extremities of the processes of the fultoportulae, which interlock with those of succeeding valves without forming knuckles.

See also
Imidazolium
Pyridinium
Chlorella vulgaris

References

Further reading

External links

AlgaeBase

Protists described in 2005
Thalassiosirales